Cascadia Daily News is a weekly newspaper published in Bellingham, Washington, United States. It was founded on January 24, 2022, as the successor to the Cascadia Weekly, and features daily news stories on its website. The newspaper is independent and locally owned, competing with the Bellingham Herald in the Whatcom County market.

History

The Cascadia Daily News launched on January 24, 2022, under the ownership of businessman David Syre and management of Ron Judd, a former Seattle Times columnist. It is the successor to the Cascadia Weekly, a local alt weekly newspaper published in Bellingham. Syre stated that the new publication would provide deeper coverage than the existing Bellingham Herald, which is owned by McClatchy and had pared back its local news coverage.

References

External links
 

2022 establishments in Washington (state)
Mass media in Bellingham, Washington
Newspapers established in 2022
Newspapers published in Washington (state)